The Chandra kingdom was a Buddhist kingdom, originating from the Indian subcontinent, which ruled the Samatata region of Bengal, as well as northern Arakan. Later it was a neighbor to the Pala Empire to the north. Rulers of Chandra kingdom were adherents of Buddhism.The founder of Chandra Dynasty was king Mahataing Chandra in 327 AD.

History
The Anandachandra Inscription (729 AD) mentions king Chandrodaya whom Sircar fixes the date of 202-229 AD. The inscription mentions kings prior to King Chandrodaya as "zealous in doing kindness to the world". The ye Dhamma inscriptions of Queen Niti Chandra are dated to early 6th century AD based on paleographic grounds.

The Chandra kingdom was one of the last Buddhist strongholds in the Indian subcontinent. The kingdom flourished as a center of the Tantric schools of Buddhism. It played a role in the diffusion of Mahayana Buddhism to Southeast Asia.

The dynasty was founded by King Mahataing Chandra in 327 AD in Wesali. King Srichandra led invasions into Kamarupa. The Chandras played an important role in the regional politics and military history of erstwhile Bengal. The Chandras ruled in Arakan and Southeast bengal. But this dynasty was founded by king Mahataing Chandra.

The Chandras were eventually overthrown during an invasion of the South Indian Chola dynasty. Following is the list of Kings from Chandra Dynasty.

Maritime relations
The coastal kingdom had trade networks with states in what is now Myanmar, Thailand, Indonesia and Vietnam. 10th century shipwrecks around the coast of Java provide evidence of maritime links between southeastern Bengal and Southeast Asia. Bronze sculptures may have been imported by the Javanese from the Chandra kingdom in southeastern Bengal. Arab merchants also traded with the kingdom.

King Anandachandra mentions mission he sent to Sinhalese King Silamegha (Aggabodhi IV) (727-766)

Archaeology
There are numerous inscriptions dating from the period of the Chandra dynasty. The three archaeological sites associated with the dynasty include Bikrampur and Mainamati in Bangladesh and Waithali in Rakhine State, Myanmar (Burma).

Education 
Chandrapur University in Shrihatta was as large as other religious institutions like Nalanda, Taxila, Mahasthangarh or Odantapuri and was established before Oxford, and Cambridge universities or even the Jagaddala Vihara. It was made by king Srichandra. Its exact location has not been found. Chandrapur university was unique in contrast with other universities and the viharas established by Buddhist kings in India. Its curriculum included almost all of the subjects from the Hindu Shastra except the grammar of Chandragomin who was Buddhist by religion. Moreover the students of this university were also Hindu Brahmins. The nine monasteries were overseen mainly by Hindu Brahmins. This is because the Buddhist king, Srichandra, granted lands in Paschimbhag in the name of Buddha for nine Brahmin monasteries where the Chaturvedas were mainly taught. Kamalakanta Gupta referred to this grant as "unique among other Buddhist kings" since it implies Srichandra's favouritism towards Brahmins.

Land distribution among 25 classes of people, guests, and students indicates an efficient administration in the universities. According to Zafir Setu, this administrative arrangement is more consistent with the present-day university system.

References

Bibliography
 
 
 
 

Medieval Bengal
Dynasties of Bengal
Buddhist dynasties of India